Damo is an ancient proto-Somali town in northeastern Somalia. It is situated in the autonomous Puntland region, 5 km west of Cape Guardafui.

From late October to early December 1975, at the invitation of the Somali government, Neville Chittick led a British-Somali archaeological expedition in the northern half of Somalia. Members of the party included the Director of the Somali National Museum in Mogadishu, Sa‘id Ahmad Warsame, as well as ‘Ali ‘Abd al-Rahman and Fabby Nielson. Particular emphasis was placed on the area near Cape Guardafui in the far northeast. Financed by the Somali authorities, the survey found numerous examples of historical artefacts and structures, including ancient coins, Roman pottery, drystone buildings, cairns, masjids, walled enclosures, standing stones and platform monuments. Many of the finds were of pre-Islamic origin and associated with ancient settlements described by the 1st century Periplus of the Erythraean Sea, among other documents. Based on his discoveries, Chittick suggested in particular that the Damo site in the Peninsula of Hafun likely corresponded with the Periplus' "Market and Cape of Spices". Some of the smaller artefacts that Chittick's company found were later deposited for preservation at the British National Museum.

See also
Architecture of Somalia
Botiala
Essina
Gondershe
Hafun
Hannassa
Heis
Malao
Mosylon
Opone
Qandala
Sarapion
Somali maritime history

References

Archaeological sites in Somalia
Former populated places in Somalia
Ancient Somalia
Maritime history of Somalia
Archaeological sites of Eastern Africa